The Dali Palace is a 35-story,  residential skyscraper completed in 2014 and located in Zuoying District, Kaohsiung, Taiwan. Construction of the building began in 2012 and it was completed in 2014. As of March 2021, the building is the tallest in the district and the 19th tallest in Kaohsiung. Constructed under strict requirements of preventing damage caused by earthquakes and typhoons common in Taiwan, the building includes facilities such as a chess room, KTV, gym, outdoor swimming pool, sauna room, saloon, and a lounge bar.

See also 
 List of tallest buildings in Taiwan
 List of tallest buildings in Kaohsiung
 Zuoying District

References

2014 establishments in Taiwan
Residential skyscrapers in Taiwan
Skyscrapers in Kaohsiung
Apartment buildings in Taiwan
Residential buildings completed in 2014